One Kiss at a Time
"One Kiss at a Time", song by Boyzone from Key to My Life: Collection, Where We Belong (album), Love Me for a Reason – The Collection
"One Kiss at a Time", song by Prince from Emancipation (Prince album)